HMS Ocean was a 98-gun second-rate ship of the line of the Royal Navy, launched from Woolwich Dockyard on 24 October 1805. She was the only ship built to her draught, and designed by Sir John Henslow.

She was converted to serve as a depot ship in 1841, and was eventually broken up in 1875. Her figurehead is preserved at Queenborough, Kent.

Notes

References

Mid-Victorian RN vessel HMS Ocean. William Loney RN - Background. Retrieved 4 November 2008.
Lavery, Brian (2003) The Ship of the Line - Volume 1: The development of the battlefleet 1650–1850. Conway Maritime Press. .

Ships of the line of the Royal Navy
Ships built in Woolwich
1805 ships